Kim Kwang-min (born 25 December 1985) is a South Korean football defender, who plays for Duhok SC in Iraqi Premier League.

Club statistics

External links
 

 Fagiano Okayama official website squad 
 Kim Kwang-min at Yahoo! Japan 

1985 births
Living people
Association football defenders
South Korean footballers
South Korean expatriate footballers
Suwon FC players
K League 2 players
J2 League players
Japan Football League players
Fagiano Okayama players
Fukushima United FC players
Korea National League players
Duhok SC players
Expatriate footballers in Japan
South Korean expatriate sportspeople in Japan